Tasmanipatus barretti, the giant velvet worm, is a species of velvet worm in the Peripatopsidae family. It is the sole species in the genus Tasmanipatus and is ovoviviparous.

Taxonomy 
Tasmanipatus barretti was described by Ruhberg et al. in 1991. The generic name Tasmanipatus refers to the species' distribution in Tasmania, Australia. The specific name barretti refers to Australian naturalist Charles Leslie Barrett, who was sent a specimen from St Marys. Barrett is thought to have published the first record of the species, though he did not recognise it as a new species.

Morphology 
The dorsal surface is mauve with a darker median stripe. The ventral surface is creamy-white. There are 15 pairs of oncopods (legs). Adults are typically 35–40 mm long, but may extend to 75 mm while walking. The common name refers to its size, which is large among the Peripatopsidae; however, much larger velvet worms exist in the Peripatidae (see Mongeperipatus solorzanoi).

References 

Onychophorans of Australasia
Onychophoran genera
Onychophoran species
Animals described in 1991